Carl-Johan Meyer (born April 1, 1994) is a Swedish ice hockey player. He made his Elitserien debut playing with Brynäs IF during the 2012–13 Elitserien season.

References

External links

1994 births
Living people
Swedish ice hockey defencemen
Brynäs IF players
Sportspeople from Uppsala